The Wrath of the Iceni is an audio drama based on the long-running British science fiction television series Doctor Who. This audio drama was produced by Big Finish Productions.

Plot
Norfolk, c. 60 AD, The Roman Occupation of Britain. The Doctor and Leela are at odds with each other, after meeting the warrior queen of the Iceni tribe, Boudica.

Cast
The Doctor – Tom Baker
Leela – Louise Jameson
Boudica – Ella Kenion
Bragnar – Nia Roberts
Caedmon / Fastucas – Michael Rouse
Pacquolas / Man – Daniel Hawksford

Notes
The Doctor and Mrs Wibbsey visit Sussex in 43 AD, in the BBC audiobooks story Relics of Time (Part of the Demon Quest series)
Nia Roberts was in the 2010 Doctor Who television story, The Hungry Earth / Cold Blood.
Ella Kenion was in the 2011 Doctor Who television episode, Let's Kill Hitler.
The story is a "pure historical", that is, a story without any science fiction elements other than the TARDIS and its crew.

Critical reception
Doctor Who Magazine reviewer Matt Michael wrote positively of the story, calling it "un-showily smart".

References

External links
The Wrath of the Iceni

60
2012 audio plays
Cultural depictions of Boudica
Fiction set in Roman Britain
Fourth Doctor audio plays
Norfolk in fiction
Works set in the 1st century